Rudi se žení was a 1911 Austro-Hungarian comedy film. It was one of a series of four films written by and starring Emil Artur Longen as the title character, Rudi. This film was never finished and all of its material has been lost.

External links
 

1911 comedy films
1911 films
Austro-Hungarian films
Czech comedy films
Hungarian black-and-white films
Austrian black-and-white films
Austrian silent films
Hungarian silent films
Austrian comedy films
Lost Hungarian films
1911 lost films
Films directed by Emil Artur Longen
Czech silent films
Czech black-and-white films